Aly Alberto Hassan (born May 15, 1989) is an American Professional soccer player.

Career
On March 19, 2012, the Strikers announced that Hassan had signed professional terms with the Fort Lauderdale Strikers following a successful preseason trial.

Hassan made his professional debut with the Strikers against FC Edmonton on April 7, 2012, in the first game of the 2012 NASL season. Hassan was sent off 40 minutes into the match, following a questionable  tackle on Edmonton's Fabrice Lassonde.

In his next home match, Hassan scored a hat-trick, his first professional goals, to lift the Strikers to a 3–2 victory against the Puerto Rico Islanders. Hassan recorded his second hat-trick of the season less than a month later, scoring three times against Fresno Fuego in the U.S. Open Cup Second Round match on May 22.

On January 9, 2013, the Strikers announced that Hassan will go on loan to Club Aurora.

On June 26, 2015, Hassan was transferred to Ottawa Fury FC after the conclusion of the Strikers' Spring season.

Honors 

Ottawa Fury
 NASL Fall Championship 2015

New York Cosmos B
 NPSL North Atlantic Conference Champion
 NPSL Northeast Region Champion

References

External links
 Fort Lauderdale Strikers

1989 births
Living people
American soccer players
American expatriate soccer players
Nova Southeastern Sharks men's soccer players
Orlando City U-23 players
Fort Lauderdale Strikers players
Club Aurora players
North Carolina FC players
Charlotte Independence players
Ottawa Fury FC players
San Antonio FC players
New York Cosmos B players
New York Cosmos (2010) players
Association football forwards
People from Weston, Florida
Soccer players from Florida
Expatriate footballers in Bolivia
USL League Two players
North American Soccer League players
USL Championship players
National Premier Soccer League players
National Independent Soccer Association players
Bolivian Primera División players
Boca Raton FC players
Sportspeople from Broward County, Florida
American expatriate sportspeople in Bolivia